Waitoki is a locality in the Rodney District of New Zealand. Wainui is approximately 5.5 kilometres to the north-east, Kaukapakapa 6.5 km to the north-west, and Dairy Flat 10 km to the south-east. The Wainui Stream joins the Waitoki Stream just to the north-east of the locality. The stream flows west into the Kaukapakapa River.

Demographics

Waitoki had a population of 1,530 at the 2018 New Zealand census, an increase of 210 people (15.9%) since the 2013 census, and an increase of 252 people (19.7%) since the 2006 census. There were 507 households, comprising 762 males and 768 females, giving a sex ratio of 0.99 males per female. The median age was 42.8 years (compared with 37.4 years nationally), with 300 people (19.6%) aged under 15 years, 303 (19.8%) aged 15 to 29, 750 (49.0%) aged 30 to 64, and 177 (11.6%) aged 65 or older.

Ethnicities were 94.1% European/Pākehā, 7.5% Māori, 1.2% Pacific peoples, 3.1% Asian, and 1.6% other ethnicities. People may identify with more than one ethnicity.

The percentage of people born overseas was 23.7, compared with 27.1% nationally.

Although some people chose not to answer the census's question about religious affiliation, 59.2% had no religion, 30.2% were Christian, 0.2% were Hindu, 0.4% were Buddhist and 2.4% had other religions.

Of those at least 15 years old, 273 (22.2%) people had a bachelor's or higher degree, and 153 (12.4%) people had no formal qualifications. The median income was $42,500, compared with $31,800 nationally. 348 people (28.3%) earned over $70,000 compared to 17.2% nationally. The employment status of those at least 15 was that 654 (53.2%) people were employed full-time, 252 (20.5%) were part-time, and 27 (2.2%) were unemployed.

Education
Waitoki School is a coeducational full primary (years 1-8) school with a roll of  students as of  The school opened in 1924 and celebrated its 75th anniversary in 1999.

Notes

Rodney Local Board Area
Populated places in the Auckland Region